Thornton Viaduct is a disused railway viaduct crossing Pinch Beck valley at Thornton, in the City of Bradford, West Yorkshire, England. It was built in an S-shape to allow a smooth access to Thornton station. 
The viaduct was part of the GNR's Queensbury Lines running between Queensbury and Keighley. It stopped carrying passengers in 1955 but remained open to goods until the 1960s. At that time, the railway closed and the tracks were pulled up. The viaduct is now a Grade II listed building.

The viaduct was reopened in 2008 as part of the Great Northern Railway Trail between Cullingworth and Queensbury along the track bed.

This was the viaduct used in the episode of Last of the Summer Wine entitled "Three Men and a Mangle" where they hoisted the mangle up from the road.

See also 
 List of railway bridges and viaducts in the United Kingdom

References

External links 

 Great Northern Trail
 

Buildings and structures in the City of Bradford
Grade II listed buildings in West Yorkshire
Grade II listed bridges
Rail trails in England
Railway viaducts in West Yorkshire
Former railway bridges in the United Kingdom
Rail trail bridges in the United Kingdom
Viaducts in England